The Voice UK is a British television music competition to find new singing talent. The eleventh series premiered on 3 September 2022 on ITV. will.i.am, Anne-Marie, Sir Tom Jones and Olly Murs returned as coaches, whilst Emma Willis returned as presenter.

On 29 October 2022, Anthonia Edwards was announced as the winner of the season, marking Tom Jones' third win as a coach and the second coach in any variation of the British version of The Voice to win more than two seasons, after Pixie Lott on the Kids' version. For the first time, the first artist to perform in the Blind Auditions went on to win the entire season which, including the final, was pre-recorded.

Coaches and presenters 

In October 2021, it was confirmed that will.i.am, Anne-Marie, Sir Tom Jones and Olly Murs would return for their eleventh, second, tenth and fifth series as coaches, respectively, whilst it was announced that Emma Willis would return for her ninth series as presenter and that AJ Odudu would not return to present the show on the ITV Hub.

Production 
Auditions for the eleventh series opened in March 2021 and closed in July 2021. The series aired in the autumn for the first time in the show's history. It was also announced that the battle rounds had been axed and would be replaced by the "Callbacks" which aired on 15 October 2022 and the final will air on 29 October 2022. 

The series began filming at Dock10 at MediaCityUK in Salford, Greater Manchester in October 2021. Also, the entire series was pre-recorded, including the grand final. The first trailer for the series premiered on 18 August 2022.

Teams
Colour key
  Winner
  Runner-up
  Third place
  Fourth place 
  Eliminated in the Semi-Final
  Eliminated in the Callbacks

Blind Auditions

Episode 1 (3 September)
Group performance: The Voice UK coaches – "Higher Love" (Whitney Houston cover)
Coach performance: Sir Tom Jones - "I Won't Crumble with You If You Fall"

Episode 2 (10 September)

 Coach performance: Olly Murs - "Sweet Caroline" (Neil Diamond cover; dedicated to the audience who returned after the COVID-19 pandemic in England and to Murs's late X Factor co-host Caroline Flack who committed suicide in February 2020)

Episode 3 (17 September)

 Coach performance: Anne-Marie - "Our Song"

Episode 4 (24 September)

 Coach performance: Olly Murs - "Livin' On a Prayer" (Bon Jovi cover; audience sing-a-long)/"Feeling Good" (Michael Bublé cover)

Episode 5 (1 October)

Episode 6 (8 October)

Episode 7 (15 October)

The Callbacks
For this season of the Voice, the show replaced the usual 'Battles' round with 'The Callbacks', which is a twist to the show first adopted by the tenth season of The Voice Australia. The Callbacks aired on 15 October. In this round, each coach brought in a mentor for their team. David Guetta, MNEK, Tom Grennan, and James Arthur were invited by will.i.am, Anne-Marie, Tom Jones, and Olly Murs, respectively. 

In the Callbacks, the coaches divided their 10 contestants selected in the Blind Auditions into three groups where they were given the same song to sing in their own styles. After all three or four artists of the same group finished their performances, the coaches will have to choose one to advance to the semi-final. A total of three artists were taken through to the semi-final per coach.

Semi-final

The Semi-final aired on 22 October 2022. The 12 contestants that had advanced from the Callbacks competed for their spots in the Finale of this season. Each coach will have to choose one artist out of three to take through to the Final. This episode was pre-recorded.

The Final 
The Final aired on 29 October 2022. Same as all the other episodes this season, the Final is also pre-recorded, with the audience and a virtual audience via Zoom voting for the final two and the winner.

The coaches kicked off the Final with the performance of "Shine" by Emeli Sandé. The show also invited Craig Eddie, the winner of last season whose coach was Anne-Marie, as Musical Guest. He performed his single "The Outside".

Elimination Chart 
Color Keys

  Team Will
  Team Anne-Marie
  Team Tom
  Team Olly
  Artist received the most public votes
  Artist was eliminated

References

External links
 

Series 11
2022 British television seasons